The Mythicomycetaceae is a family of dark-spored agarics that have palely pigmented spores. The two genera are monotypic and share features such as horn-like dark stems, pigmented mycelium at their bases, and are small brown mushrooms in north temperate forests. Their basidiospores lack germ pores. The family is closely related to the Psathyrellaceae.

References

Agaricales families